Gering may refer to:

Places
Gering, Nebraska, a city
Gering, Germany, a municipality in Mayen-Koblenz, Rhineland-Palatinate

Other uses
Gering (surname)